DARPA, the Defense Advanced Research Projects Agency, is a research agency of the US Government.

DARPA may also refer to:
 DARPA Quantum Network, the first quantum key distribution network
 DARPANET, aka ARPANET, the first operational packet switching network of a set that came to compose the global Internet
 DARPA Agent Markup Language, focused on the creation of machine-readable representations for the Web
 DARPA Falcon Project
 DARPA Grand Challenge, a prize competition for driverless vehicles
 DARPA Grand Challenge (2007), third driverless car competition 
 DARPA Network Challenge, a prize competition for exploring the roles the Internet and social networking play in the real-time communications
 DARPA Silent Talk, aka Brain–computer interface, a direct communication pathway between the brain and an external device
 Darpa, Iran, a village in Kerman Province, Iran
 Darpa (butterfly), a genus of skipper butterfly

See also
 Delaware River Port Authority (DRPA)